Greenlawn is an unincorporated community in Ralls County, in the U.S. state of Missouri.

History
A post office called Greenlawn was established in 1888, and remained in operation until 1904. The community was so named on account of flat green fields near the original town site.

References

Unincorporated communities in Ralls County, Missouri
Unincorporated communities in Missouri